Stephen DeLancey "Steve" Benjamin (born September 29, 1955 in Glen Cove, New York) is an American competitive sailor and Olympic silver medalist.

Career
He was College Sailor of the Year in 1978. At the 1984 Summer Olympics, Benjamin finished in 2nd place in the 470 class Mixed Two-Person Dinghy along with his partner Chris Steinfeld.

Steve was named US Sailing’s 2015 Yachtsman of the Year

References 
 

1955 births
American male sailors (sport)
ICSA College Sailor of the Year
Living people
Olympic silver medalists for the United States in sailing
Sailors at the 1984 Summer Olympics – 470
Yale Bulldogs sailors
Medalists at the 1984 Summer Olympics
Fireball class world champions
World champions in sailing for the United States